More Music for Films is a compilation album by British musician Brian Eno, released in 2005.

Track listing

Tracks 1-14 originally appeared on the initial 1976 promo-only LP release of Music for Films, and on CD as part of the 1993 release Eno Box I: Instrumental.
Tracks 15 to 21 originally appeared on the 1983 release Music for Films Volume 2.
Tracks 5 and 8 originally appeared on the commercial 1978 release of Music For Films as "Patrolling Wire Borders" and "Quartz", respectively.

Personnel
Brian Eno
Daniel Lanois
Technical
Russell Mills - artwork, design, typography
David Buckland - photography

References

External links

2005 albums
Brian Eno albums
Daniel Lanois albums
Albums produced by Brian Eno
Albums produced by Daniel Lanois
E.G. Records albums
Sequel albums